EMBO Molecular Medicine is an open-access peer-reviewed medical journal covering research in molecular medicine.

The journal was published by Wiley-Blackwell together with the European Molecular Biology Organization since its launch in 2009, until December 2013, when EMBO Press was started.
According to the Journal Citation Reports, the journal had a 2021 impact factor of 14.005.

References

External links

Molecular and cellular biology journals
Publications established in 2009
English-language journals
Monthly journals
European Molecular Biology Organization academic journals
Creative Commons Attribution-licensed journals